The title Earl of Wiltshire is one of the oldest in the Peerage of England, going back to the 12th century. It is currently held by the Marquess of Winchester, and is used as a courtesy title for the eldest son of the marquess.

The earldom was first created for Harvey of Léon, who married Sybilla, an illegitimate daughter of King Stephen. The title lapsed after Harvey lost his English lands during the Anarchy, since at that time one could not be an earl without the territory to support the dignity.

Patrick of Salisbury was created Earl of Wiltshire by the Empress Matilda, probably after July 1143, but he was usually styled Earl of Salisbury.  He was the second but eldest surviving son of William of Salisbury and the grandson of Walter of Salisbury, the founder of Bradenstoke Priory, in Wiltshire.  He was Sheriff of Wiltshire in October 1152, when he was addressed as "Earl Patrick, sheriff" in a writ of Stephen. Patrick of Salisbury, Earl of Wiltshire, passed the title to his great-granddaughter Margaret Longespée. She married Henry de Lacy, Earl of Lincoln, they had a daughter who became suo jure Countess of Lincoln and Wiltshire on her mother's death.  She married three times, but the earldom of Wilshire seems to have reverted to the crown with her death in October 1348.

William le Scrope was created Earl of Wiltshire in 1397. He was executed during the events leading to the deposition of Richard II by Henry IV. The charter which granted his earldom limited its inheritance to heirs male, but did not contain the usual additional limitation of his body. Thus in 1859 a collateral descendant attempted to claim the earldom, but the claim was rejected by the House of Lords.

The next creation was for James Butler, eldest son of the 4th Earl of Ormond. He fought on the Lancastrian side at the Battle of Towton, and afterwards was executed and posthumously attainted.

The earldom was next held by three members of the Stafford family, beginning with John, a younger son of the 1st Duke of Buckingham.

Anne Boleyn's father Thomas was the recipient of the next creation, but after outliving his son and with no other male heirs upon his death the title became vacant. He was the great-nephew of James Butler, the earl of the 1449 creation.

Finally, in 1550 William Paulet was created Earl of Wiltshire. He was made Marquess of Winchester the next year, and his descendants continue to hold both titles.

Earl of Wiltshire, First Creation (1139)
Hervey le Breton, Earl of Wiltshire (forfeit 1141)

Earl of Wiltshire, creation by the Empress Matilda (c. 1145)
Patrick of Salisbury, 1st Earl of Salisbury (c. 1122–1168)
William of Salisbury, 2nd Earl of Salisbury (d. 1196)
William Longespée, 3rd Earl of Salisbury (c. 1176–1226), jure uxoris Ela, Countess of Salisbury (1187–1261)
Margaret Longespée, Countess of Salisbury (c. 1261 – c. 1311), granddaughter of the 3rd Earl by his son William III Longespée. She married Henry de Lacy, Earl of Lincoln.
Alice de Lacy, 4th Countess of Lincoln (1281–1348)

Earl of Wiltshire, Second Creation (1397)
William le Scrope, 1st Earl of Wiltshire (1350–1399) (executed 1399)

Earl of Wiltshire, Third Creation  (1449)
James Butler, Earl of Wiltshire and 5th Earl of Ormond (1420–1461) (forfeit 1461)

Earl of Wiltshire, Fourth Creation (1470)
John Stafford, 1st Earl of Wiltshire (d. 1473)
Edward Stafford, 2nd Earl of Wiltshire (1469–1499) (extinct)

Earl of Wiltshire, Fifth Creation (1510)
Henry Stafford, 1st Earl of Wiltshire (1479–1523) (extinct)

Earl of Wiltshire, Sixth Creation (1529)
Thomas Boleyn, 1st Earl of Wiltshire and 1st Earl of Ormond (1477–1539) (extinct)

Earl of Wiltshire, Seventh Creation (1550)
see Marquess of Winchester

The title 'Earl of Wiltshire' is now used as the courtesy title of Lord Winchester's eldest son and heir.

Family tree

See also 
Henry Carey, 1st Baron Hunsdon, who was offered the title but declined it

Notes

Extinct earldoms in the Peerage of England
Earl
Earldoms in the Peerage of England
Forfeited earldoms in the Peerage of England
 
Noble titles created in 1139
Noble titles created in 1397
Noble titles created in 1449
Noble titles created in 1470
Noble titles created in 1510
Noble titles created in 1529
Noble titles created in 1550